Anna Hursey (born 22 June 2006) is a Welsh table tennis player. She is thought to be the youngest person to represent Wales at senior level in any sport, having been aged just 10 when she competed for Wales in a European Championship qualification match against Kosovo in 2017.

Hursey competed at the 2018 Commonwealth Games in Gold Coast, Australia, and the 2022 Commonwealth Games in Birmingham, United Kingdom, where she came third in the women's doubles event.

Personal life
Hursey was born in Carmarthen, Wales, and attended Cardiff High School. She left Cardiff High School after Year 8. Hursey's mother is Chinese, and in 2019, Hursey moved to Tianjin, China to take up table tennis full-time. She is a United Nations ambassador for climate change in sport, and in 2021, Hursey spoke with US President Joe Biden about climate change.

Career
Hursey began playing table tennis at the age of five. In 2017, Hursey, aged 10, competed for Wales in a European Championship qualification match against Kosovo. In doing so, she is believed to be the youngest person to represent Wales at senior level in any sport. In the same year, she competed at the 2017 World Cadet Challenge. She competed for Wales at the 2018 Commonwealth Games in Gold Coast, Australia. She was the youngest competitor in Commonwealth Games history. Hursey was nominated for the 2018 BBC Young Sports Personality of the Year award, which was won by Kare Adenegan.

After the 2020 Welsh National Championships, in which Hursey finished second to Charlotte Carey, she was unable to return to China as the Chinese borders were closed due to the COVID-19 pandemic. She instead trained in Peterborough, England. Hursey has been ranked the number one ranked Welsh under-15 woman, and number two ranked Welsh woman of any age. At the 2021 ITTF World Youth Championships, Hursey and Portugal's Matilde Pinto came third in the under-15 girls' doubles event.

Hursey was selected in the Wales team for the 2022 Commonwealth Games; Hursey and Charlotte Carey came third in the women's doubles event at the Games, the first time that Welsh women had won a Commonwealth Games table tennis medal. She was part of the Wales team that finished fourth in the women's team competition, and she lost in the quarter-finals of the women's singles event.

References

External links
 
 
 

2006 births
Living people
Welsh female table tennis players
Commonwealth Games competitors for Wales
Table tennis players at the 2018 Commonwealth Games
Welsh expatriate sportspeople in China
Commonwealth Games bronze medallists for Wales
Commonwealth Games medallists in table tennis
Table tennis players at the 2022 Commonwealth Games
Medallists at the 2022 Commonwealth Games